The , operating under the brand name J-POWER, formerly , is an electric utility in Japan. It mainly produces electricity from coal and hydroelectric power stations. It also has a few wind farms and is currently building a nuclear plant in Ohma, Aomori prefecture, that is scheduled to begin operations in November 2014. J-Power is the sole operator of the transmission lines connecting the four main islands of Japan.

History 

This was broken up into a number of utilities, which have become Japan's modern electric utility companies. However, in the battered state of post-war Japan, there were few investors out there to put money in these new companies, and certainly not enough to allow for sufficient R&D of power sources that Japan needed to keep up with the demand of power, thus it was decided that the occupied government would specially create an electric company with such capabilities. On September 19, 1952 the Electric Power Development Company (EDPC) was established as a government agency.

In 1997, the Japanese government announced the privatization of EDPC, and in 2004, it went public and was listed on the Tokyo Stock Exchange.

See also 
 Nuclear power in Japan

External links 
 J POWER, official website
  Wiki collection of bibliographic works on Electric Power Development Company

Energy companies established in 1952
Nuclear power companies of Japan
Electric power companies of Japan
Public utilities established in 1952
Japanese companies established in 1952